Sara Varon is a graphic novelist and illustrator best known for her work in children's literature. She is the author of the book Robot Dreams.

Early life
Varon grew up in the Illinois suburbs, and later attended the School of Visual Arts in New York City, graduating in 2002. As of 2006, she lived in Brooklyn, New York. Varon is on the faculty of the School of Visual Arts.

Career
Varon's characters are entirely non-human — she claims to be bad at drawing people — except in her book My Pencil and Me where she draws herself. Her characters often form unlikely friendships — cats and chickens, cupcakes and eggplants — which combine to form what the New York Times calls "endearing, uncommon narratives."

Varon a series of alebrijes of some of her cartoon characters in collaboration with a Oaxacan artist. She has also made traditional-style Turkish carpets with images of her characters.

Personal life
As of June 2006, Varon lives in Brooklyn, New York. She is married and her husband is Guyanese.

Honors and awards 
Varon's book Sweaterweather (2003) was a 2004 Harvey Award nominee for Best Graphic Novel.

Varon's book Robot Dreams (2007) landed on many 2007 and 2008 "best-of" lists, including:
 Oprah's Book Club
 YALSA Great Graphic Novels
 NYPL Book for the Teen Age
 NYPL Book for Reading and Sharing
 Bank Street Book of Outstanding Merit
 NCTE Notable Children's Book in the English Language Arts
 American Library Association Notable Children's Book
 Publishers Weekly 150 Best Books of the Year
 Kirkus Reviews Best Children's Books of 2007
 Bulletin of the Center for Children's Books Blue Ribbon title

Bake Sale (2011) was named a YALSA Great Graphic Novel for 2012 and selected by the School Library Journal as one of the Top 10 Graphic Novels of 2011. In addition, it was a Junior Library Guild Fall 2011 Selection.

Varon was a recipient of the Maurice Sendak Fellowship in 2013.

Her and Cecil Castellucci's book Odd Duck (2013) was a Eisner Award nominee. In addition, it was named by School Library Journal as one of the Top 10 Graphic Novels of 2013, and Kirkus Reviews named it one of the Best Children's Books of 2013. Odd Duck was a Spring 2013 Selection of the Junior Library Guild. Translated into French as Des canards trop bizarres, it won the 2015 Livrentête Prize in France.

Varon's book New Shoes (2018) was selected as one of the books features in the Eric Carle Museum of Picture Book Art's exhibit Out of the Box in 2019. 

Her book Hold Hands (2019) was selected as a New York Times Book Review Notable Children's Book of the Year in 2019.

Bibliography
 Sweaterweather & Other Short Stories (2003) 
 Chicken and Cat (2006) 
 The Present (2005) 
 Robot Dreams (2007) 
 Chicken and Cat Clean Up (2009) 
 Bake Sale (2011) 
 (with Cecil Castellucci) Odd Duck (2013) 
 (with Aaron Reynolds) President Squid (2016) 
 New Shoes (2018)  
 Hold Hands (2019) 
 My Pencil and Me (2020)

References

External links
 

Female comics writers
American female comics artists
American graphic novelists
Living people
Artists from Illinois
School of Visual Arts alumni
Year of birth missing (living people)